John Delzoppo (born 3 December 1931) is an Australian retired politician who was Speaker of the Parliament of Victoria from 1992–1996 as part of the Liberal Kennett Government.

Delzoppo was born in the Melbourne suburb of Flemington in 1931 and attended University High School. He gained entry to the Victorian College of Pharmacy and, after graduating, went on to work as a pharmaceutical chemist for several years.

He was first elected to the Victorian Parliament in April 1982 as Member for the electorate of Narracan. In Opposition, he held a number of parliamentary party positions, including Minister for Transport, Local Government, Water Resources, and Property and Services.  He also served on the Public Accounts and Estimates Committee. Delzoppo also served as a Councillor for the Shire of Buln Buln for 20 years.  Delzoppo retired from the Victorian Parliament in 1996. He is married with two sons and two daughters.

References

1931 births
Living people
Politicians from Melbourne
Australian people of Italian descent
Members of the Victorian Legislative Assembly
Liberal Party of Australia members of the Parliament of Victoria
Speakers of the Victorian Legislative Assembly